The First Global Revolution is a book written by Alexander King and Bertrand Schneider, and published by Pantheon Books in 1991.  The book follows up the earlier 1972 work-product from the Club of Rome titled The Limits to Growth.  The book's tagline is A Report by the Council of the Club of Rome.  The book was intended as a blueprint for the 21st century putting forward a strategy for world survival at the onset of what they called the world's first global revolution.

Contents
The Problematique
The Whirlwind of Change
Some Areas of Acute Concern
The International Mismanagement of the World Economy
Intimitations of Solidarity
The Vacuum
The Human Malaise
Conclusion: The Challenge
 The Resolutique
 Introduction
The Three Immediacies
Governance and the Capacity to Govern
Agents of the Resolutique
Motivations and Values
Learning Our Way Into a New Era

Overview
The book is a blueprint for the twenty-first century at a time when the Club of Rome thought that the onset of the first global revolution was upon them.  The authors saw the world coming into a global-scale societal revolution amid social, economic, technological, and cultural upheavals that started to push humanity into an unknown.  The goal of the book was to outline a strategy for mobilizing the world's governments for environmental security and clean energy by purposefully converting the world from a military to a civil economy, tackling global warming and solving the energy problem, dealing with world poverty and disparities between the northern hemisphere and the Southern Hemisphere.

The book saw humankind at the center of the revolution centered on:
Global economic growth
New technologies
Governments and the ability to govern
Mass Media
Global food security
Water availability
Environment
Energy
Population growth
Learning systems
Values/Religions
Materials

The product of a think tank, the book attempted to transcend the nation-state governance paradigm of the nineteenth-century and the twentieth-century and sought a way to eliminate some of the challenges seen inherent with those older systems of global governance.  As such, it explored new and sometimes controversial viewpoints.

Later editions

An English language edition of this book was published in 1993 by Orient Longman of Hyderabad, India.

See also

 Politics of global warming
 United Nations Framework Convention on Climate Change and accompanying Kyoto Protocol (CO2 Regulations)
 Post–Kyoto Protocol negotiations on greenhouse gas emissions
 Green Climate Fund

References

Sustainability books
1991 non-fiction books
Pantheon Books books
Collaborative non-fiction books